Leonides Samé (born 9 July 1969) is a Cuban rower. He competed in the men's quadruple sculls event at the 2000 Summer Olympics.

References

1969 births
Living people
Cuban male rowers
Olympic rowers of Cuba
Rowers at the 2000 Summer Olympics
People from Holguín
Pan American Games medalists in rowing
Pan American Games bronze medalists for Cuba
Rowers at the 1995 Pan American Games